Route 130 is a highway in Linn County, Missouri  in length. The route is signed in a south–north direction.

Route description 
In the south, Route 130 begins at Route 139 in Laclede and heads due west through a rural area. Route 130 continues northward for the remainder of its course. It skirts the eastward boundary of Pershing State Park and crosses several creeks before coming to an end at a concurrency between U.S. Route 36 and Route 139.

History
Route 130 was assigned by 1949. However, at the time, the designation only ran a portion of its current length. Between 1974 and 1975, it was extended to its present southern terminus.

Junction list

References

130
Transportation in Linn County, Missouri